Wols was the pseudonym of Alfred Otto Wolfgang Schulze (27 May 19131 September 1951), a German painter and photographer predominantly active in France. Though broadly unrecognized in his lifetime, he is considered a pioneer of lyrical abstraction, one of the most influential artists of the Tachisme movement. He is the author of a book on art theory entitled Aphorismes de Wols.

Biography
Alfred Otto Wolfgang Schulze was born in Berlin in 1913 into a wealthy family; his father was a high-ranking civil servant and patron of the arts who maintained friendships with many prominent artists of the period, including Otto Dix. In 1919, the family moved to Dresden, where consequently he found his love for art in 1927. In 1924, Schulze was given a still camera, an event that, along with the death of his father in 1929, became one of the defining moments of his life. In 1930 he began to pursue an apprenticeship with his camera at the Reiman-Schule, the Berlin school of applied art. He was a multifaceted man who was capable of teaching German, painting, and capturing photographs of portrait landscape.

After abandoning school, Schulze pursued several interests, including ethnography before moving to Paris in 1932 on the advice of László Moholy-Nagy. After visiting Germany in 1933, he decided not to return, instead traveling to Barcelona, Majorca, and Ibiza, where he worked odd jobs, including a stint as a taxicab driver and a German tutor.

In 1936, he received official permission to live in Paris with the help of Fernand Léger; as an army deserter, Schulze had to report to the Paris police on a monthly basis. Beginning in 1937, he actively worked on his photographs, which were shown in many of Paris's most prestigious galleries. He befriended luminaries of the period, including Max Ernst and Jacques Prévert. As a German national, Schulze (like Ernst) was interned at the start of World War II, but he managed to escape and hide in Cassis near Marseilles, where he passed the time drawing and painting in watercolor. In 1942 he fled from the Germans to the safety of Montelimar.

He spent most of the war trying to emigrate to the United States, an unsuccessful and costly enterprise that may have driven him to alcoholism. Upon his return to Paris, after the hype from the war had died down, he had his first exhibition of watercolors in December 1945 at the Galerie René Drouin, where despite the lack of commercial success he made an impression on the circle of intellectuals around the gallery. These included Jean Paulhan, Francis Ponge, Georges Limbour and André Malraux. The small works were displayed in light boxes. A second exhibition in the same gallery two years later saw greater recognition. His paintings represented a rejection of figuration and abstraction, and a projection into a metaphysical plane.

In the years following the war, Schulze concentrated on painting and etching. His health declined severely towards the end of the 1940s; in 1951 he died of food poisoning at the Hotel Montalembert in Paris, after releasing himself from hospital against medical advice. After his death his works were shown at the Kassel documenta (1955), documenta II (1959) and documenta III (1964).

Artistic style

Wols' painting style, as early as 1946–47 (Untitled, 1946–47, Yellow Composition, 1946–7; Berlin, Neue N.G., It's All Over The City, 1947), was informal, gestural, with the paint applied in layers by means of dripping and with scratching into the surface. This new development in art proved influential, earning him the praise of artists such as Georges Mathieu and critics such as Michel Tapié, who coined the term Art autre (the Other Art) to describe the new style.

Wols was noted for his etchings and for his use of stains (taches) of color dabbed onto the canvas (as exemplified by his painting Composition, c. 1950). His painted work contains figurative elements as well as free improvisations and abstract elements. Spontaneity and immediateness determine the creative work of Wols, who never underwent any formal artistic training. Randomness (initially inspired by the Surrealist psychic Automatism) plays an important role in his unstructured compositions. In later years Wols was particularly interested in the combination of powerful brushstrokes with a relief-like painted surface structure.

Influences
His inspiration to become an artist derived from the work of the artists Paul Klee, Otto Dix and George Grosz. His advisor Moholy-Nagy instructed him to pursue his artistic endeavours in Paris. His encounters with Jean-Paul Sartre and Simone de Beauvoir awakened a lively interest in the philosophy of Existentialism.  In the late 1940s Sartre chose to promote his abstract art.

Writings
 Aphorismes de Wols, Amiens 1989

Examples of paintings
 The Blue Phantom
 Constructions hazardeuses

References

External links
 Agence photographique, Réunion des Musées Nationaux, works by Wols
 Wols Etchings at the Tate 
 Wols online

School of Paris
Art Informel and Tachisme painters
1913 births
1951 deaths
20th-century German painters
20th-century German male artists
German male painters
Photographers from Berlin
Modern painters
Abstract painters